The 1999 Badminton Asia Championships was the 18th tournament of the Badminton Asia Championships. It was held in Kuala Lumpur, Malaysia.

Medalists

Medal table

Final Results

Men's singles

Women's singles

Men's doubles

Women's doubles

Mixed doubles

See also 
 Medalists at the Badminton Asia Championships

References 
 http://worldbadminton.com/shuttlenws/19990915a.htm
 http://worldbadminton.com/shuttlenws/19990916a.htm
 http://worldbadminton.com/shuttlenws/19990917a.htm
 http://worldbadminton.com/shuttlenws/19990918a.htm
 http://worldbadminton.com/shuttlenws/19990919a.htm
 https://www.tournamentsoftware.com/sport/draws.aspx?id=3B75CD0C-09BB-464A-BFD4-5E83CBC0281A

Badminton Asia Championships
Asian Badminton Championships
1999 Asian Badminton Championships
Asian Badminton Championships
Asian Badminton Championships